The SASM/GNC/SRC romanization of Tibetan, commonly known as Tibetan pinyin or ZWPY (Chinese: Zàngwén Pīnyīn 'Tibetan spelling'), is the official transcription system for the Lhasa dialect of the Tibetan language for personal names and place names in China. It is based on the pronunciation used by China National Radio's Tibetan Radio, which is based on the pronunciation of the Lhasa dialect, and reflects its pronunciation, except that it does not mark tone. It has been used within China as an alternative to the Wylie transliteration for writing Tibetan in the Latin script since 1982. 

Tibetan pinyin is a phonetic transcription, and as such its spelling is tied to actual pronunciation. Wylie on the other hand is a transliteration system, where mechanical conversion to and from Tibetan and Latin script is possible. Within academic circles, Wylie transliteration (with a v replacing the apostrophe) is more commonly used.

Overview

Onsets overview
Independent onsets in the initial syllable of a word are transcribed as follows: 

For more general case, see #Onsets.

Vowels and final consonant
The 17 vowels of the Lhasa dialect are represented in as follows:

Ending a syllable, -r is usually not pronounced, but it lengthens the preceding vowel. In the same place, -n usually nasalises the preceding vowel. Consonants at the end of a syllable are transcribed as follows:

Single syllable orthography
The tone of a syllable depends mostly on its initial consonant. In this table, each initial is given in the International Phonetic Alphabet (IPA) with the vowel a and a tone mark to present tone register (high/low).

Onsets 
Below is a comprehensive transcription table of onsets of an initial syllable of a word. If the syllable to transcribe is not the first syllable of a word, see #Onset variation.

Rimes
Below is a comprehensive transcription table of rimes of a final syllable of a word, with IPA transcription for the Lhasa dialect. If the syllable to transcribe is not the final syllable of a word, see Coda variation.

Take "ཨ" to be the consonant (not "◌").

Intersyllable influence

Onset variation
 Bare low aspirated variation
 k*, q*, t*, p*, x*, s*, ky*, ch* become g*, j*, d*, b*, ?*, ?*, gy*, zh* respectively
 pa* (་བ) and po* (་བོ) become wa and wo respectively

Coda variation

Sometimes there is intersyllabic influence:

Encoding

Examples

See also

Hanyu pinyin
Standard Tibetan
THL Simplified Phonetic Transcription
Tibetan script
Wylie transliteration

Notes

References

Citations

Sources 

 
 Guójiā cèhuìjú dìmíng yánjiūsuǒ 国家测绘局地名研究所 (Institute for Place Names of the State Survey Bureau; ed.). Zhōngguó dìmínglù 中国地名录 / Gazetteer of China. (Beijing, SinoMaps Press 中国地图出版社 1997); . Contains official spellings for place names.
 Zàngwén Pīnyīn Jiàocái – Lāsàyīn 藏文拼音教材•拉萨音 / bod yig gi sgra sbyor slob deb, lha sa'i skad (Course in the Pöyig Kigajor of Lhasa dialect; Běijīng 北京, Mínzú chūbǎnshè 民族出版社 1983), . Pöyig Kigajor (ZWPY) is a modified version of the official transcription "Tibetan pinyin" (ZYPY), with tone letters.
 Wylie, Turrell: A Standard System of Tibetan Transcription In: Harvard Journal of Asiatic Studies 1959, p. 261-267.
 David Germano, Nicolas Tournadre: THL Simplified Phonetic Transcription of Standard Tibetan (Tibetan & Himalayan Library, December 12, 2003).
 The Transliteration and Transcription of Tibetan (Tibetan & Himalayan Library)
 Romanization of Tibetan Geographical Names – UNGEGN

Romanization of Tibetan
Pinyin